Dainhat railway station is a Kolkata Suburban Railway station on Bandel–Katwa line connecting from  to Katwa, and under the jurisdiction of Howrah railway division of Eastern Railway zone. It is situated at Dhramatala, Dainhat of Purba Bardhaman district in the Indian state of West Bengal. Number of EMUs and passengers trains stop at Dainhat railway station. The distance between Howrah and Dainhat railway station is approximately 137 km.

History 
The Hooghly–Katwa Railway constructed a line from Bandel to Katwa in 1913. This line including Dainhat railway station was electrified in 1994–96 with 25 kV overhead line.

References 

Railway stations in Purba Bardhaman district
Kolkata Suburban Railway stations
Howrah railway division